Vicentino Prestes de Almeida, (Born 1900 in Chiniquá, Rio Grande do Sul, Brazil) was a Brazilian paleontologist. He died on October 28, 1954, in São Pedro do Sul.

Biography

Prestes was a self-taught paleontologist. Beginning in 1925, he worked with many visiting paleontologists in both Santa Maria and São Pedro do Sul in the Brazilian state of Rio Grande do Sul.

Many of the fossils collected by Prestes are in museums in Porto Alegre, such as the Júlio de Castilhos Museum, the Zoobotanical Natural History Museum of Rio Grande do Sul, the Museum of Science and Technology (PUCRS) and the Museum of Paleontology Irajá Damiani Pinto.

Friedrich von Huene named the carnivorous Triassic reptile Prestosuchus chiniquensis in Prestes's honor (from Prestes and Chiniquá, his birthplace).

Prestes organized and arranged the fossils for the Instituto de Educação General Flores da Cunha and contributed considerably to the Paleorrota Geopark.

Notes

Further reading 
   length: 60 pages; Guide to the fossil finds in Rio Grande do Sul, and especially in the Santa Maria area.
  length: 582 pages

Brazilian paleontologists
People from Rio Grande do Sul
1900 births
1954 deaths